Penelope Tree (born 2 December 1949) is an English fashion model who rose to prominence during the swinging sixties in London.

Family
Penelope Tree is the only child of Ronald, a British journalist, investor and Conservative MP, and Marietta Peabody Tree, a U.S. socialite and political activist. She is the half-sister of both the racehorse trainer Jeremy Tree and the author Frances FitzGerald and a niece of former Massachusetts governor Endicott Peabody.

Life and career
Her family initially objected to her career as a model, and when she was first photographed at the age of 13 by Diane Arbus, her father vowed he would sue if the pictures were published.

Tree made a striking appearance at the 1966 Black and White Ball thrown by author Truman Capote, wearing a black V-neck tunic with long slashes from the bottom making floating panels, worn over black tights.

The sensation she caused led photographers Cecil Beaton and Richard Avedon to work together to make her a supermodel. She was sixteen and her father had relented. David Bailey described Penelope as "an Egyptian Jiminy Cricket".

In 1967, Tree moved into Bailey's flat in London's Primose Hill neighbourhood. It became a social space for hippies during the "Swinging Sixties" who, Bailey recalled, would be "smoking joints I had paid for and calling me a capitalist pig!" In another famous quote, John Lennon asked to encapsulate Tree in three words, called her, "Hot, Hot, Hot, Smart, Smart, Smart!"

She has been extensively compared to The Beatles for inspiring the swinging 60's movement and for galvanizing a generation of young American females. Scars from late-onset acne ended her career in the early 1970s: "I went from being sought-after to being shunned because nobody could bear to talk about the way I looked." In 1972, she was arrested for possession of cocaine. In 1974, Bailey and Tree split up and she moved to Sydney. She appeared in the British comedy film The Rutles in 1978.

She was married to South African musician Ricky Fataar (a member of The Flames, The Rutles, and the Beach Boys). She has two children, Paloma Fataar (a graduate of Bard College and a student of Tibetan Buddhism and music), and Michael MacFarlane, by her relationship with Australian Jungian analyst Stuart MacFarlane.

Penelope Tree is a patron of Lotus Outreach, a charity which works in Cambodia in partnership with local grassroots women's organisations to give girls from the very poorest families the wherewithal to go to school.

In 2011 she appeared as an interviewee for a documentary on the life of fashion editor Diana Vreeland.

References

External links
Interview with Penelope Tree, The Guardian, 2008

1950 births
Living people
English female models
English people of American descent
English philanthropists
English expatriates in Australia
Place of birth missing (living people)
Models from London
Peabody family
Marshall Field family